Victor Clarence Truman (21 December 1899 – 7 November 1976) was an Australian rules footballer who played with Carlton and Fitzroy in the Victorian Football League (VFL).

Notes

External links 

Vic Truman's profile at Blueseum

1899 births
1976 deaths
Australian rules footballers from Melbourne
Carlton Football Club players
Fitzroy Football Club players
People from Carlton, Victoria